Nico Rodewald (born 16 March 1998) is a German footballer who plays as a forward for FSV 08 Bissingen.

References

External links
 Nico Rodewald at FuPa

1998 births
Living people
German footballers
Association football forwards
VfR Aalen players
SC Freiburg II players
3. Liga players
Regionalliga players
Oberliga (football) players